The King Alfonso XIII's Cup 1926 was the 26th staging of the Copa del Rey, the Spanish football cup competition.

The competition began on 28 February 1926, and concluded on 16 May 1926 with the final, held at the Mestalla in Valencia, in which Barcelona lifted the trophy for the seventh time following a 3–2 victory over Athletic Madrid.

Teams
For the first time ever, runners-up of each regional championship were able to participate in the tournament. So the tournament was expanded to 24 teams.

Aragon: Iberia SC, Zaragoza CD
Asturias: Sporting de Gijón, Fortuna de Gijón
Cantabria: Racing de Santander, Gimnástica de Torrelavega
Castile and León: Cultural y Deportiva Leonesa, Real Unión Deportiva
Catalonia: FC Barcelona, RCD Español
Galicia: Celta de Vigo, Deportivo de La Coruña
Gipuzkoa: Real Unión, Real Sociedad
Murcia: Real Murcia, Cartagena FC
 Centre Region: Real Madrid, Athletic Madrid
 South Region: Sevilla FC, Real Betis
Valencia: Valencia CF, Levante FC
Biscay: Athletic Bilbao, Arenas Club

Group stage

Group 1

Group 2

Group 3

Group 4

Tie-break match

Group 5

Tie-break match

Group 6

Group 7

Group 8

Quarterfinals
First leg:

Semifinals
May 9, 1926

Final

Notes

References
Linguasport.com
RSSSF.com

1926
1926 domestic association football cups
1925–26 in Spanish football